The Banu Isam were a Berber Muslim dynasty that ruled Ceuta, present-day Spain, for four generations. The town had been destroyed in a rebellion, and was lying waste; sometime in the middle of the 9th century, Mâjakas, chief of the Berber Majkasa tribe, resettled it and founded a dynasty that ruled the town until the Umayyads took it over in 931.

Its kings were:
Mâjakas
`Isâm, son of Mâjakas
Majîr, son of `Isâm
Ridâ, son of `Isâm (?-931), who paid allegiance to the Idrisids, but surrendered the city to the Umayyads when the Idrisid capital fell.

See also
History of Ceuta

References

History of Ceuta

Berber dynasties